FK Sloga 33 is a football club based in Petrovac, Serbia. They compete in the Podunavlje-Šumadija Zone League, the fourth tier of the national league system.

History
The club took part in the 1951 Yugoslav Cup, defeating Radnički Beograd 4–1 in the opening round. They faced Partizan in the next phase and lost 15–0, as Stjepan Bobek scored eight goals for the Belgrade side.

After winning the Podunavlje Zone League in 2007, the club spent six seasons in the Serbian League West. They would finish as champions in the 2012–13 season to earn promotion to the Serbian First League, reaching the second tier for the first time in their history. In July 2016, the club withdrew from the competition due to financial reasons.

In the summer of 2016, the club was reformed and started off in the Braničevo District League, the fifth tier of Serbian football. They reached the Serbian League West in 2018, but suffered relegation in 2021.

Honours
Podunavlje Zone League (Tier 4)
 2006–07
Braničevo District League (Tier 5)
 2016–17

Notable players
This is a list of players who have played at full international level.
  Francis Bossman
  Marjan Marković
For a list of all FK Sloga Petrovac na Mlavi players with a Wikipedia article, see :Category:FK Sloga Petrovac na Mlavi players.

Managerial history

References

External links

 
 Club page at Srbijasport

1933 establishments in Serbia
2016 establishments in Serbia
Association football clubs established in 1933
Association football clubs established in 2016
Football clubs in Yugoslavia
Football clubs in Serbia
Phoenix clubs (association football)